William Faulder Smith (14 November 1886 – 3 March 1937) was an English field hockey player from Carlisle, who competed in the 1920 Summer Olympics. He was a member of the British field hockey team, which won the gold medal.

References

External links
 
profile

1886 births
1937 deaths
English male field hockey players
English Olympic medallists
Olympic field hockey players of Great Britain
British male field hockey players
Field hockey players at the 1920 Summer Olympics
Olympic gold medallists for Great Britain
Olympic medalists in field hockey
Medalists at the 1920 Summer Olympics